Jouret is the surname of the following people:

Luc Jouret (1947–1994), Belgian religious group leader in Switzerland 
Plastic Bertrand (born Roger Allen François Jouret in 1954), Belgian musician, songwriter, producer, editor and television presenter

French-language surnames